The Taiwan Grand Shrine was the highest ranking Japanese Shinto shrine in Taiwan during Japanese colonial rule. It was located in Taihoku, Taiwan (now Zhongshan District, Taipei). Among the officially sanctioned Shinto shrines in Taiwan, Taiwan Grand Shrine held the highest rank of them all. The Grand Hotel stands at the shrine's former site.

History 

Following the death of Prince Yoshihisa in 1895, the Governor-General of Taiwan Nogi Maresuke began planning for a shrine in Yoshihisa's honor. Originally, the plan was to construct the shrine at Yuanshan Park (now part of Taipei Expo Park); however, Nogi's successor Kodama Gentarō and chief planner Gotō Shinpei decided to move it across the Keelung River to Jiantan Mountain for the site's higher elevation. The vantage point would allow the shrine to overlook the entire city, making it symbolic for the Japanese Empire's colonial power.
Kanpei-taisha
In 1915, a railway station named  was placed at the foot of Jiantan Mountain to serve the shrine. On April 12, 1923, Crown Prince Hirohito, who would become Emperor Shōwa three years later, embarked on a two-week tour of Taiwan. In preparation for his visit to the shrine,  was created leading up to the shrine from the city, with the  crossing the Keelung River.

The shrine was elevated in rank to Grand Shrine (jingū) in 1944 (Shōwa 19) when Amaterasu was enshrined, making it the highest-ranking shrine in Taiwan. The opening ceremony of the new shrine was planned to be on October 28. However, on October 23, 1944, a cargo plane lost control and crashed atop the mountain where the Taiwan Grand Shrine was located, heavily damaging roughly half of the shrine. The shrine was never fully repaired due to Japan's surrender after World War II, and much of the shrine's materials were taken for construction projects elsewhere. In its place, the Grand Hotel was constructed in 1952, where it remains as a prominent landmark of the city.

Gallery

See also
Shintoism in Taiwan
List of Shinto shrines in Taiwan

References

Jingū
Shinto shrines in Taiwan
1901 establishments in Taiwan
1945 disestablishments in Taiwan
Taiwan under Japanese rule
20th-century Shinto shrines